Gordon Davies (born 4 September 1932) is an English footballer, who played as an inside forward in the Football League for Manchester City, Chester and Southport.

References

1932 births
Living people
Footballers from Manchester
Association football inside forwards
English footballers
Ashton United F.C. players
Manchester City F.C. players
Chester City F.C. players
Southport F.C. players
Morecambe F.C. players
English Football League players